The 1837 generation was an Argentine intellectual movement named after the date a literary hall with most of its members was established. Influenced by the new romantic ideas, they rejected the cultural Spanish heritage of the country. They did not acknowledge any national roots in the indigenous peoples or the period of European colonization, focusing instead on the Revolution as the birth of the country, as it gave them freedom, the possibility to behave as free people. They considered themselves "sons of the May Revolution", they were born shortly after it, and wrote some of the earliest Argentine literary works.

The group established a literary hall in 1837 in Buenos Aires, hence the name. This Salón Literario closed six months after it was created because of the reiterated warnings from the government. Initially, they claimed to be neutral in the Argentine Civil Wars, they wrote works biased against the federal governor Juan Manuel de Rosas (such as El Matadero by Esteban Echeverría or Facundo by Domingo Faustino Sarmiento) because Rosas was the Buenos Aires government of that time, but they were also against the former Unitarian governments, with whom they didn't agree in their absolutist manners that were considered by them as a mere restoration of the manners of the Spanish colony. Their efforts to install a full democratic Republic and guarantee civil rights by means of a peaceful propaganda were vain and shortly after that they ended up exiled or assassinated. After Rosas was overthrown in 1852, their writings inspired the first Argentine Constitution in 1853, and their persons promoters of the Organización Nacional, the articulation and organization of the political divisions, infrastructure and institutions of the country, that in its final form didn't was federal nor unitarian but a balance of both.

They were called "unitarians" in a loose sense and by Rosas propaganda.

Some notable members of this generation were Esteban Echeverría, Juan Bautista Alberdi, Juan María Gutiérrez, Domingo Faustino Sarmiento who was president between 1868 and 1874, Miguel Cané (senior), Bartolomé Mitre, Andrés Lamas, Antonio Somellera, Vicente Fidel López, Carlos Tejedor, Juan Bautista Peña, Florencio Varela, Juan Cruz Varela, José Mármol, José Rivera Indarte (Buenos Aires), Quiroga Rosas, Antonino Aberastain, Santiago Cortínez (San Juan), Benjamín Villafañe, Félix Frías (Tucumán), Francisco Álvarez, Paulino Paz, Enrique Rodríguez, Avelino Ferreyra, Ramón Ferreyra (Córdoba), Juan Thompson (Corrientes).

References

Esteban Echeverría, 1846. Dogma Socialista de la Asociación de Mayo, precedido de una ojeada retrospectiva sobre el movimiento intelectual en el Plata desde el año 1837. (in Spanish) https://web.archive.org/web/20160319135757/http://trapalanda.bn.gov.ar/jspui/bitstream/123456789/2810/1/008235.pdf

Cultural generations
Romanticism
Argentine Civil War
Argentine literature
Organizations established in 1837
Classical liberalism
Domingo Faustino Sarmiento